is a 1991 beat-'em-up video game by Capcom that follows players as they control characters through the kingdom of Malus to defeat monsters led by the dragon Gildiss. It features a level advancement system, allowing character attributes to be upgraded as players progress through the game. The game's music was composed by Yoko Shimomura.

The King of Dragons was ported to the Super NES in 1994. An emulated version of the game has been released as part of Capcom Classics Collection Vol. 2, Capcom Classics Collection: Reloaded, and Capcom Beat 'Em Up Bundle.

Gameplay

The game has 16 levels, though many are quite short. The King of Dragons features a role-playing video game-like level advancement system. Points scored for killing monsters and picking up gold count towards experience, and the character gains levels at regular intervals. With each level, the character's health bar increases, other attributes such as range improve, and the character also becomes invulnerable for a few seconds. Along the way, different weapon and armor upgrades for each character may also be picked up.

The King of Dragons features a simple control system that consists of a single attack button, and a jump button. By pressing both buttons, the character unleashes a magical attack that strikes all enemies in screen (its strength varies according to the character used) at the expense of losing energy. The fighter, cleric and dwarf can also use their shield to block certain attacks by tilting the joystick back right before the impact.

This is one of the many Capcom games to feature the yashichi power-up item (a "boost power-up" icon resembling a shuriken). There are three such power-ups hidden throughout the game, each giving the player an extra continue.

The five playable heroes each have their own traits and fighting skills in the game. The Fighter is very good with melee attacks and defense but lacks magical ability. The Dwarf is able to dodge and block attacks, is the most agile character that has decent melee attacks albeit the shortest range and little magic ability. The Elf has good agility and great range with archery but is not physically strong. The Cleric has great defense, decent magic (with the ability to heal his comrades) and melee attacks but bad agility. The Wizard has poor defense but very good magical attacks and quick melee attacks.

Ports
The game was ported to the Super NES in 1994. This port reduces the number of simultaneous players down to two. The sprites' size were also reduced moderately. It is also possible to assign the magic attack and shield defense to different buttons and analyzed samples FM-styles soundtrack.

The arcade version is part of Capcom Classics Collection Vol. 2, which was released for the PlayStation 2 and Xbox in November 2006. This was also in Capcom Classics Collection: Reloaded for the PlayStation Portable.  The game is included as part of the Capcom Beat 'Em Up Bundle for the PlayStation 4, Xbox One, Nintendo Switch, and Microsoft Windows.

Reception 

In Japan, Game Machine listed The King of Dragons on their October 1, 1991 issue as being the most-successful table arcade unit of the month, outperforming titles such as Street Fighter II: The World Warrior.

Doris Stokes of British magazine Zero reviewed the arcade game, rating it four out of five. She called it "a good, nicely addictive blast 'em up."

In 2023, Time Extension included the game on their top 25 "Best Beat 'Em Ups of All Time" list.

References

External links

1991 video games
Arcade video games
Capcom beat 'em ups
Capcom Power System Changer games
CP System games
Fantasy video games
Romstar games
Super Nintendo Entertainment System games
Side-scrolling beat 'em ups
Video games developed in Japan
Video games scored by Yoko Shimomura
Multiplayer and single-player video games